Sin Byung-Ho (born April 26, 1977) is a South Korean former football player who played for Jeju United, Gyeongnam FC, Chunnam Dragons, Ulsan Hyundai Horang-i and Mito HollyHock in Japan.

On 2 November 2008, he announced his retirement. After retirement, he coached Jeju Middle School football team.

Club statistics

National team statistics

External links
 

 
 National Team Player Record 

1977 births
Living people
Association football forwards
South Korean footballers
South Korean expatriate footballers
South Korea international footballers
Yokohama F. Marinos players
Mito HollyHock players
Ulsan Hyundai FC players
Jeonnam Dragons players
Gyeongnam FC players
Jeju United FC players
J1 League players
J2 League players
K League 1 players
Expatriate footballers in Japan
South Korean expatriate sportspeople in Japan
Konkuk University alumni
Sportspeople from Jeju Province